The 2000 French Grand Prix (formally the LXXXVI Mobil 1 Grand Prix de France) was a Formula One motor race held on 2 July 2000 at the Circuit de Nevers Magny-Cours, Magny-Cours, Burgundy, France with 112,112 spectators in attendance. It was the ninth round of the 2000 Formula One World Championship and the 86th French Grand Prix. McLaren driver David Coulthard won the 72-lap race starting from second position. His teammate Mika Häkkinen finished second with Rubens Barrichello third for the Ferrari team.

Michael Schumacher was leading the World Drivers' Championship and his team Ferrari led the World Constructors' Championship before the race. Coulthard started the Grand Prix alongside Michael Schumacher who began from pole position after setting the quickest lap in qualifying. Barrichello began from third on the grid and overtook Coulthard going into the first corner. Michael Schumacher maintained his start line advantage and kept the lead after the first round of pit stops. During the course of the second stint of the race, Michael Schumacher began to struggle with tyre wear, allowing Coulthard to close the gap and passed him on lap 40. Coulthard maintained his lead through the second round of pit stops and won the race. Michael Schumacher retired on lap 59 with engine failure promoting Häkkinen to second position. Barrichello took third, ahead of BAR driver Jacques Villeneuve in fourth. 

Coulthard took his third victory of the season, the ninth of his Formula One career, and the result meant saw him reduce Michael Schumacher's lead in the World Drivers' Championship to twelve points. Häkkinen remained third on 38 points, six ahead of Barrichello. In the World Constructors' Championship, McLaren's one-two finish allowed them to narrow the gap to Ferrari to be six points behind, with eight races of the season remaining.

Background
The 2000 French Grand Prix was the ninth of the seventeen rounds in the 2000 Formula One World Championship and was held at the  clockwise Circuit de Nevers Magny-Cours in Magny-Cours, Burgundy, France on 2 July 2000. Sole tyre supplier Bridgestone brought the more balanced and less grippy Soft and the faster Extra Soft dry compound tyres to the Grand Prix. Teams were urged by Bridgestone technical director Yoshihiko Ichikawa to select the extra soft compounds instead of the soft tyres since they provided additional car grip and understeer was not as pronounced at the Circuit de Nevers Magny-Cours than at rougher circuits. A total of eleven teams (each representing a different constructor) each fielding two drivers each entered the race with no changes from the season entry list.

Going into the race, Ferrari driver Michael Schumacher led the World Drivers' Championship with 56 points, ahead of McLaren's David Coulthard on 34 points and his teammate Mika Häkkinen on 32. Rubens Barrichello of Ferrari was fourth with 28 points while Benetton driver Giancarlo Fisichella was fifth on 18 points. In the World Constructors' Championship, Ferrari were leading with 84 points, McLaren and Benetton were second and third with 66 and 18 points respectively, while Williams with 15 and Jordan with ten contended for fourth place.

Coulthard set the fastest times on the first day, ahead of McLaren test driver Olivier Panis. Arrows driver Jos Verstappen lost control of his car after suffering a mechanical problem and crashed into the barriers at turn two. Verstappen sustained neck strain and withdrew from testing. He was later passed fit to compete in the Grand Prix. Coulthard remained fastest on the second day. Fisichella damaged the underside of his car's chassis, limiting his testing time as Benetton made repairs to his car. Häkkinen was quickest on the final day of testing. Michael Schumacher stopped on circuit as his Ferrari engine failed, causing his team to fit a new engine into the chassis. Ferrari went to their private testing facility, the Fiorano Circuit, on 27 June where test driver Luca Badoer shook down three Ferrari F1-2000 cars and also took part in pit stop practices.

After the Canadian Grand Prix, where he stalled on the grid before the formation lap before receiving a ten-second stop-go penalty because his mechanics worked on his car 15 seconds before the race started, Coulthard said that Ferrari could still be caught in the season's nine remaining races: "We have to look towards Magny-Cours and put this (Montreal) race behind us. The championship is not over yet and although we cannot change what happened in Canada, we can try to close the gap." Former World Champion and President of the British Racing Drivers Club (BRDC) Jackie Stewart backed Coulthard to clinch the title after Häkkinen's continuing run of poor results. Michael Schumacher came into the race confident that his car would perform well at the circuit. Benetton team principal Flavio Briatore played down his team's chances saying, "We need a miracle to finish on the podium."

Almost each of the eleven teams modified their cars for the Grand Prix. Ferrari introduced chimney stacks on the F1-2000 during free practice for the first time as well as additional vents to extract warm air for aerodynamic efficiency. The team reverted to previous specifications for qualifying and the race. It also modified the axle construction at the car's bottom with composite materials designed to minimise friction when it touched the asphalt surface. McLaren installed a new extractor profile for free practice and qualifying but removed it for warm-up and the race. It also asymmetrically positioned the rear-view mirrors, the right placed further forward and lower than the left for improved visibility in the track's final corner. Sauber modified the sides' opening and BAR installed a new body and ailerons. Prost was provided an updated V10 engine from suppliers Peugeot for driver Jean Alesi, who lambasted the engine's driveability. Jordan introduced a revised braking system.

Practice
There were four practice sessions which were held before the Sunday race—two one-hour sessions on Friday, and two 45-minute sessions on Saturday. The Friday morning and afternoon practice sessions were held in dry and hot weather conditions. Michael Schumacher set the first practice session's fastest lap of 1 minute and 16.474 seconds, two-tenths of a second quicker than Häkkinen. Prost driver Nick Heidfeld was third fastest, ahead of Williams' Ralf Schumacher. The two Jaguar drivers were fifth and seventh, Eddie Irvine ahead of Johnny Herbert. The pair were separated by Fisichella in sixth. Alesi, Arrows' Pedro de la Rosa and Jenson Button of the Williams team were eighth to tenth. Just four drivers set timed laps after two-thirds had passed and fourteen others set one timed lap before returning to the pit lane. There were four drivers who did not set lap times: Coulthard whose car developed a mechanical fuel pump problem, Barrichello drove one installation lap to conserve tyre usage and both Jordan drivers decided to sit out the session. 

In the second practice session, Coulthard was the fastest driver with a lap of 1:16.253 despite losing 25 minutes due to an oil tank leak that his team repaired by removing the engine in his car, limiting his running to four minutes; Häkkinen finished with the second fastest time. The Ferraris were second and fourth, Michael Schumacher was faster than Barrichello. Sauber's Mika Salo was fifth-quickest, ahead of Fisichella, Jordan's Jarno Trulli, Heidfeld, Ralf Schumacher and Trulli's teammate Heinz-Harald Frentzen in positions six through ten. There was a lack of grip at the tight final corner leading onto the pit lane straight, catching out multiple drivers. Overall grip was lacking around the circuit and the BAR duo of Jacques Villeneuve and Ricardo Zonta beached their cars in the gravel trap. Trulli stalled in his attempt to simulate a standing start.

The weather remained dry and hot for the Saturday morning practice sessions. Every racer was able to drive their vehicles on the circuit in preparation for qualifying later that day. Coulthard set the fastest time of the third practice session, a 1:15.965, the first driver to lap faster than 1:16. Häkkinen was second fastest, almost two-tenths of a second off Coulthard's pace. The two Jordan teammates were quicker than the day before with Trulli setting the third-quickest lap and Frentzen behind him in fourth. Both Jaguars continued to be quick with Irvine fifth and Herbert eighth. The two were separated by Michael Schumacher and Button. Barrichello and de la Rosa were ninth and tenth. 

In the final practice session, Coulthard was unable to improve his time because of an engine failure halfway through the circuit that required him to enter the pit lane with smoke billowing from his car though he remained fastest overall. Coulthard's mechanics replaced the engine in his vehicle for qualifying since there was a lack to time to correct the issue during practice. Häkkinen managed to set a quicker time and remained with the second quickest lap. Barrichello ran quicker and was third fastest, in front of Ralf Schumacher. The Jordan drivers of Trulli and Frentzen were fifth and sixth, their best times two thousands of a second apart. Irvine was seventh quickest, ahead of Michael Schumacher who concentrated on qualifying set-up. Button and Herbert followed in ninth and tenth.

Qualifying
Saturday's afternoon one hour qualifying session saw each driver limited to twelve laps, with the starting order decided by their fastest laps. During this session, the 107% rule was in effect, which necessitated each driver set a time within 107 per cent of the quickest lap to qualify for the race. Qualifying was held in dry and hot weather, and conditions continued to increase occasionally during the session. Michael Schumacher achieved his fourth pole position of the season, and the 27th of his career, with a time of 1:15.632 which he set approximately 25 minutes into the session. He was joined on the front row of the grid by Coulthard with his fastest time was 0.102 seconds slower and drove the spare McLaren vehicle while the team's mechanics fitted his race car with a new fuel pump. Coulthard was unable to lap faster when he spun through 180 degrees and then the FIA instructed him to undergo a car weight inspection in the pit lane. Barrichello secured third having changed his car's set-up during the session which garnered confusion over changes in the ride height. Häkkinen took fourth and was demoted to the position by Barrichello on the latter's final run with the latter experiencing difficulty in the slow speed corners. Ralf Schumacher qualified fifth late in the session and was happy with his starting position. Irvine was demoted by Ralf Schumacher to sixth in the closing stages of qualifying. BAR driver Villeneuve qualified in seventh. 

Jordan's Trulli and Frentzen were seventh and eighth. Both drivers were disappointed with their performance; Trulli went wide off the circuit and used the off surface to return to the circuit, preventing him from lapping faster. Button qualified tenth. Herbert in eleventh failed to qualify in the top ten by nearly three-tenths of a second. Salo took twelfth on the grid with his fastest time set when air and track temperatures were lowered by cloud cover. He was ahead of de la Rosa in the faster of the two Arrows in 13th position; de la Rosa's electronics system failed and he returned to the pit lane to drive the spare Arrows car. Fisichella started from 14th position due to car balance and tyre wear, nearly one-tenth of a second faster than Benetton teammate Alexander Wurz; both drivers reported that their cars had grip issues. The two were split by Pedro Diniz in the other Sauber and Heidfeld. Alesi followed in 18th. Zonta set the 19th fastest time and used BAR's spare car following an engine failure on his race car. Verstappen took 20th due to a lack of grip. The two Minardi drivers Marc Gené and Gastón Mazzacane qualified at the rear of the grid in positions 21 to 22; both drivers were 2.4 and 2.6 seconds slower than the pole sitter respectively, Minardi's best qualifying performance from first position over the course of the season up to that point.

Post-qualifying 
After the qualifying session, but before the warm-up period, the Fédération Internationale de l'Automobile (FIA) safety delegate, Charlie Whiting announced that he had banned practice starts at the pit lane exit after observing the behaviour of drivers in the area during the Saturday free practice sessions.

Qualifying classification

Warm-up
The drivers took to the track at 09:30 Central European Summer Time (UTC+2) for a 30-minute warm-up session, in sunny weather conditions. Overnight rain made the asphalt surface slippery but the sun dried the circuit out as the session progressed; lap times were substantially slower than observed in the preceding two days. Teams installed wet tyres to their cars to begin the session until they switched to dry compound tyres as lap times lowered and the condition of the circuit improved. Drivers made setup changes to their cars and some reported issues. Häkkinen recorded the fastest time of 1:19.329 which was set with two minutes remaining. Coulthard was second in the other McLaren car. Michael Schumacher set the third fastest time with Trulli fourth. Michael Schumacher drove the spare Ferrari car and his race car, making adjustments to adjust to the changing track conditions. Some drivers lost control of their cars on the slippery track, and Frentzen damaged a semi-axle by going off the circuit.

Race

The race started before 112,112 spectators at 14:00 local time. The conditions on the grid were dry before the race. All drivers started on the Extra Soft dry compound tyres. Tyre usage by driver and car setup changes by drivers affected compound wear. Autosport wrote that "the key to the French GP was always going to be the start" due to the short pit lane straight leading into a fast left-hand corner rather than having a heavy braking zone. The publication noted "For the drivers in the even numbered grid positions, on the inside line, it's always a bit difficult. The cars on the outside have a better run at the first turn, and can gain ground by sweeping across in front of those caught on the inside." Coulthard removed the tailplane from his car's rear aerofoil to reduce the effect of an understeer. 

Coulthard had better start of the front runners off the line, though Michael Schumacher moved into his path to retain the lead. Coulthard then moved to his right but was blocked and had to slow, which allowed Barrichello to pass him for second. Salo made the best start in the field moving from twelfth to ninth by the conclusion of the first lap, while Irvine lost four positions over the same distance as Ralf Schumacher dropped from fifth to seventh. At the completion of the first lap, the top six drivers were Michael Schumacher, Barrichello, Coulthard, Häkkinen, Villeneuve, and Frentzen. Michael Schumacher began to pull clear from the rest of the field and set consecutive fastest laps. Barrichello began to delay the McLaren drivers to allow his teammate to extend his lead. Further down the field, Trulli passed Ralf Schumacher for seventh on lap two. Heidfeld was overtaken by Alesi for 14th on the same lap. On the following lap, Ralf Schumacher retook seventh from Trulli. Heidfeld lost a further position to Fisichella on lap four. Ralf Schumacher started to challenge Frentzen for sixth on the fifth lap. 

At the front of the pack, Michael Schumacher was in control, extending his lead over Barrichello to five seconds by lap ten. Button took tenth position from Irvine on lap twelve, while Heidfeld collided with Alesi at the Adelaide hairpin while attempting to overtake Fisichella, sending his teammate into a spin who fell to 18th. Button moved into ninth place when he passed Salo on lap 13. Zonta, who was running 17th, suffered brake problems on lap 17 and collided with the tyre barriers which caused his retirement from the Grand Prix. By the 18th lap, Michael Schumacher had extended his lead over Barrichello by 6.2 seconds, who in turn was continuing to hold up Coulthard in third. Häkkinen was a further 1.4 seconds behind his teammate but was drawing ahead of Villeneuve in fifth. Herbert made an unscheduled pit stop due to a gearbox issue that caused him to gradually lose the use of all his gears and he retired three laps later. Meanwhile on the same lap, Alesi became the first driver to pit for tyres. 

Trulli became the first front runner to pit on lap 21, followed by Villeneuve, Frentzen and Ralf Schumacher. Coulthard managed to pass Barrichello on the outside on lap 22 for second place at the exit of the Adelaide hairpin. Coulthard entered the hairpin wide and was provided with more speed to overtake Barrichello who did not swerve into Coulthard. Häkkinen, Button, Michael Schumacher, Coulthard and Barrichello all made pit stops over the following three laps. Verstappen pulled onto the side of the pit straight to retire with gearbox problems on lap 26. Coulthard was able to close the gap on Michael Schumacher to under a second by lap 32, having set the fastest lap of the race in the process, a 1:19.479 on the 28th lap; the latter was struggling with his tyres in the warm climate. He attempted to overtake Michael Schumacher two laps later but Schumacher defended his position. Coulthard slowed to avoid a collision and made the middle finger hand gesture in his immediate anger towards Michael Schumacher. The manoeuvre allowed Häkkinen to close up on the two leading drivers. On the previous lap, Mazzacane spun off at the third corner and retired. Wurz locked his brakes going into turn 15, causing him to beach his car in the gravel trap and retired on lap 36. Button became the first driver to pit twice on lap 39. 

Coulthard went down the inside of Michael Schumacher into the Adelaide hairpin as Schumacher steered wide to cover. He forced Michael Schumacher onto the outside verge upon exiting the turn and moved into the lead on lap 40. Michael Schumacher's right front wheel made slight contact with Coulthard's left rear tyre exiting the hairpin. Michael Schumacher then immediately withstood Häkkinen's attempts to overtake him. Frentzen and de la Rosa became the next two drivers to make pit stops on the same lap. Michael Schumacher and Häkkinen made pit stops for the second time on lap 43 and both emerged in third and fourth respectively. Barrichello's pit stop on the 44th lap lasted 16.8 seconds and saw him drop to fifth because his team had difficulty fitting a cross threaded wheel nut on his right front tyre. This eliminated Barrichello from contention for the victory. De La Rosa retired in the pit lane with transmission failure after completing 45 laps. At the conclusion of the 46th lap, Coulthard entered the pit lane for his final pit stop which lasted 7.9 seconds. He rejoined in the lead, three seconds ahead of Michael Schumacher.
 
At the completion of lap 48, with the front-runners completing their pit stops, the first six drivers in the order was Coulthard, Michael Schumacher, Häkkinen, Barrichello, Villeneuve, and Trulli. At the tail-end of the field, Gené and Alesi made contact on lap 52 and both drivers were sent spinning sideways. Both drivers continued in their respective positions. Further up, Ralf Schumacher passed Trulli to clinch sixth position at turn five. Häkkinen, meanwhile, was less than one second behind Michael Schumacher by lap 53 and continued to battle the latter for second position as his tyres degraded quicker than the McLarens. Irvine overtook Diniz for twelfth position two laps later. On the 58th lap, Häkkinen was close behind Michael Schumacher and nearly outdragged him at the exit of Lycee corner. Michael Schumacher ran wide to hold off Häkkinen. During lap 59, Häkkinen overtook Michael Schumacher when the latter ran wide as a result of his locking the rear wheels under braking for the Adelaide hairpin. Michael Schumacher retired with engine failure on the same lap. 

Coulthard slowed slightly because he felt his lead was safe. Häkkinen finished second 14.7 seconds behind, ahead of Barrichello in third, Villeneuve in fourth, Ralf Schumacher in fifth and Trulli rounded out the points scoring positions in sixth. Frentzen in seventh held off Button in eighth place who was being closed up to Fisichella in ninth during the final laps of the Grand Prix. Salo, Diniz and Heidfeld followed in the next three positions, with Irvine, Alesi and Gené the final classified finishers.

Post-race
The top three drivers appeared on the podium to collect their trophies and in the subsequent press conference. Coulthard described his race weekend as "exhausting" because of the problems his team encountered during the event. He also apologised for the hand gestures he made towards Michael Schumacher after his first overtaking manoeuvre on the latter. Häkkinen stated that he was happy with his second-place result and praised his team's efforts. He also spoke of how he watched Michael Schumacher's racing lines and believed he would have passed him had he not retired with an engine failure. Barrichello revealed that he was ordered by Ferrari to reduce his pace in the race's closing stages as he held a large gap of 35 seconds to Villeneuve.

After Ferrari's victory at the previous race, their team principal Jean Todt, said that "we seemed to be in a strong position but, of course, it is the order at the finish that counts", while Michael Schumacher said that his car's tyres dropped in performance following his first pit stop. McLaren technical director Adrian Newey said that the pit stop strategy was crucial in winning the race: "The tyre wear did not spring any surprises on us and we were able to trust our estimations and co-ordinate the pit-stops to our best advantage." Villeneuve was happy to finish fourth and was surprised by his good start. Heidfeld, who made contact with his teammate Alesi during the race, apologised for the collision. Ralf Schumacher said that he slowed to secure his fifth position. Trulli described his race as "difficult" because of the hot temperatures though he praised his mechanics for their work.

The overtaking manoeuvres made by Coulthard on Michael Schumacher received much media attention after the race. Coulthard accused Michael Schumacher of unsporting behaviour and dangerous driving, saying: "I had a clean run at Michael on the outside and equally I felt he drove me wide. You could say he has the right to do that because he has track position. I'm not arguing against that. I just don't think Michael is very sporting." Michael Schumacher later denied any wrongdoing and cited a similar incident at the 1999 Japanese Grand Prix where Coulthard pushed him wide although no objections were made. He also admitted that he did not see Coulthard's hand gesture. Coulthard sought clarification with the FIA over such overtakes with a source from Formula One's governing body noting: "It was hard racing – they are racing drivers aren't they?" Norbert Haug, Mercedes' head of motorsport, was asked by a journalist whether Coulthard's gesture was unsporting and gave young racing fans the wrong impression and Haug replied: "You don’t understand, in motor-racing, that is a traditional gesture used to indicate to the driver ahead that you intend to overtake him in one lap’s time." GrandPrix.com said that Coulthard's overtake meant that the driver "is ready to stand up to Michael and he is not afraid of what will happen if Michael does not lift."

FIA president Max Mosley said that the single swerving manoeuvre done by Michael Schumacher at the start of the Grand Prix was "more of a convention" agreed to by drivers rather than a formal regulation, adding: "They are all grown men at the height of their profession. However, where we would get involved is if the move was totally outrageous and deemed to be dangerous." Coulthard said he understood the regulations to mean that a manoeuvre that sees a driver go across the track on purpose to block another competitor warranted a penalty or disqualification. He added that he would raise the subject at the drivers' meeting prior to the following  but not personally with Michael Schumacher. The outcome of the drivers' meeting was that Michael Schumacher would be permitted to continue swerving to defend the race lead at the start of events after an agreement that would have led to a ban on such tactics was not reached when Ralf Schumacher lent his support to his brother.

The result of the Grand Prix meant that Coulthard narrowed the gap to Michael Schumacher in the World Drivers' Championship to twelve points. Häkkinen remained in third place, six points ahead of Barrichello. Fisichella behind them maintained fifth position. In the World Constructors' Championship, McLaren's one-two finish reduced the lead of Ferrari to six points. Williams made up two points on the Benetton team, although they were still one point behind. Jordan retained fifth position with eleven points, with eight races of the season remaining.

Race classification
Drivers who scored championship points are denoted in bold.

Championship standings after the race 

Drivers' Championship standings

Constructors' Championship standings

Note: Only the top five positions are included for both sets of standings.

References

French Grand Prix
French Grand Prix
Grand Prix
July 2000 sports events in Europe